Sky Gates Airlines is a Russian cargo airline which operates principally out of Zhukovsky and Sheremetyevo  airports in Moscow, Russia, where it is also headquartered.

History 

In October 2016, Sky Gates commenced domestic and international services from Moscow Sheremetyevo Airport using a leased Boeing 747-400F aircraft.

Sky Gates Airlines suspended all operations on in February 2022 due to sanctions with plans to restart services in the foreseeable future.

In March 2022, Azerbaijan-based Silk Way West Airlines took over both of Sky Gates' aircraft. In the same month, the operating certificate of the airline was suspended at its request.

Fleet 
As of June 2018 the Sky Gates Airlines fleet consisted of the following aircraft:

References

External links 

 Official website 

Airlines established in 2016
Defunct airlines of Russia
Companies based in Moscow
Cargo airlines of Russia
Russian companies established in 2016